Scotforth is a suburb in the south of the city of Lancaster in Lancashire, England. It is home to Scotforth St Paul's Church of England Primary School  and St Paul's Church. The civil parish, which does not include the suburb had a population  of 239 recorded in the 2001 census, increasing to 321 at the 2011 Census.

Parts of Lancaster were made up of several villages; Scotforth used to be a separate village. Some of the village's original terraces can still be seen on parts of Hala Road and Scotforth Road.

Cross Fleury, in his 1891 history of Lancaster, tells the story of Bonnie Prince Charlie's search for a suitable battlefield on which to make his last stand against the Duke of Cumberland. A potential site was identified in Scotforth, and were it not  for the rebel Prince's sudden change of mind and continued retreat northwards, 'The Battle of Scotforth' might easily have become the name of that great rout in British history ... as opposed to the now infamous name of Culloden.

Scotforth is home to St Paul's Church of England Primary School and to Dorrington Road, which is the longest terrace of houses in Europe. Lancaster Animal Care, a local animal charity is also based there. The suburb has bus routes operated by Stagecoach Cumbria & North Lancashire heading towards the university in the south and Morecambe in the north.

References

Sources

External links

Populated places in Lancashire
Geography of Lancaster, Lancashire